The Symmachiini are a tribe of metalmark butterflies (family Riodinidae).

Genera
As numerous Riodinidae genera have not yet been unequivocally assigned to a tribe, the genus list is preliminary.

Chimastrum
Esthemopsis
Lucillella
Mesene
Mesenopsis
Panaropsis
Phaenochitonia
Pirascca
Pterographium
Stichelia
Symmachia
Xenandra
Xynias

Riodininae
Taxa named by Henry Walter Bates
Butterfly tribes